Sir William Hurly, 3rd Baronet (died 1691) was an Anglo-Irish Jacobite politician. 

Hurly was the son of Sir Maurice Hurly, 2nd Baronet  and Margaret O'Dwyer, and in 1684 he succeeded to his father's baronetcy. An adherent of James II after the Glorious Revolution, in 1689 he was the Member of Parliament for Kilmallock in the Irish House of Commons during the Patriot Parliament. Owing to his support for the Jacobite cause, Hurly was attainted in 1691 and forfeited his estates and title. 

He married Mary Blount, by whom he had a least one son, John, who served in James II's army.

References

Year of birth unknown
1691 deaths
17th-century Anglo-Irish people
Baronets in the Baronetage of Ireland
Irish Jacobites
Irish MPs 1689
Members of the Parliament of Ireland (pre-1801) for County Limerick constituencies
People convicted under a bill of attainder